Queensberry is a hill in the Lowther Hills range, part of the Southern Uplands of Scotland. The most southerly mountain in the range, it lies in the parish of Kirkpatrick-Juxta and is a prominent landmark throughout Dumfriesshire. It is frequently climbed from the Daer Reservoir to the north and the minor roads to its south and east. As well as being a placename of multiple addresses throughout southern Scotland, the hill also lend its name to the Duke of Queensberry and Marquess of Queensberry peerages and, subsequently, 'Queensberry Rules' in the sport of boxing.

References

Marilyns of Scotland
Donald mountains
Mountains and hills of the Southern Uplands
Mountains and hills of Dumfries and Galloway
Grahams